Slättbergshallen is a sports venue for ice sports in Trollhättan, Sweden. It opened on 14 November 2009. It consists of one indoor venue with a bandy field, which holds 3,400 people, but can hold 4,000 at bigger events,  and two indoor venues with ice hockey rinks, one with a spectator capacity of around 2,000 and one without.

The arena was the venue of a four nation bandy tournament in December 2016 and for the Division B at the 2017 Bandy World Championship.

References

External links
 Slättbergshallen 

2009 establishments in Sweden
Bandy venues in Sweden
Buildings and structures in Västra Götaland County
Sport in Västra Götaland County
Sports venues completed in 2009
Sport in Trollhättan